Xebio Arena Sendai (ゼビオアリーナ仙台) is an arena in Sendai, Miyagi, Japan. It is the home arena of the Sendai 89ers of the B.League, Japan's professional basketball league.

Sports Events

bj League All-star Game (2016)
New Japan Pro-Wrestling's New Japan Cup final (2021, planned)

Entertainment Events
Kiss (2019)
Journey (2017)
One Ok Rock (2013)
Momoiro Clover Z (2013)
Seiko Matsuda (2014)
Uverworld (2014, 2016)
Nana Mizuki (2015)
Miwa (2017)
Kenji Sawada (2018)

Access 
 Namboku Line, Tohoku Main Line: 5 minutes walk from Nagamachi Station.

References

External links

Indoor arenas in Japan
Basketball venues in Japan
Boxing venues in Japan
2012 establishments in Japan
Music venues in Japan
Sendai 89ers
Sports venues completed in 2012
Sports venues in Sendai